HNoMS Roald Amundsen is a Fridtjof Nansen-class frigate of the Royal Norwegian Navy.

Construction and commissioning
Built by the Spanish shipbuilders Navantia, in Ferrol, Roald Amundsen was the second of the Fridtjof Nansen class to be launched and then commissioned into the Royal Norwegian Navy.

Service

References

External links
 - Royal Norwegian Navy's page on the Fridtjof Nansen class

Frigates of Norway
Fridtjof Nansen-class frigates
2005 ships
Ships built in Spain